The office of Deputy Secretary-General of the State Council functions as the deputy to the Secretary-General. Currently, five people serve as deputy secretary-general. The Deputy Secretary-General can hold concurrent positions. In general the Deputy Secretary-General has equivalent administrative rank as a vice minister of the state, though occasionally some Deputy Secretaries General will hold the rank of a minister.

Historically, the Deputy Secretary-General has been a powerful position. Its title holders are often involved in the day-to-day management of government and has direct access to the state council's most important officeholders, including the Premier and Vice-Premiers. Many Deputy Secretaries-General are later promoted to higher positions such as leading a ministry or a province. Ma Kai and Wang Yang eventually ascended to become Vice-Premier.

List of officeholders 

State Council of the People's Republic of China